MV Imperial Transport was an oil tanker built in the early 1930s for the Houlder Line. During World War II, the ship was torpedoed by a German submarine in early 1940 and broke in half. The stern section was saved and a new forward half was built and mated to the ship, which returned to service in 1941. Imperial Transport was torpedoed again in early 1942, but her crew was able to get her back to port. She was repaired in the United States and was back in service by early 1943. The ship was sold to a Norwegian company in 1947, sold again two years later and finally scrapped, in 1958.

Description
Imperial Transport was an  oil tanker. She was powered by a pair of four-stroke, eight-cylinder, diesel engines, built by the Northeastern Marine Engineering Co. with a total power of 633 nominal horsepower.

Construction and career

Imperial Transport was completed in 1931 for the Houlder Line. The ship broke in half about five minutes after the impact and the crew abandoned ship (two drowning in the process). Part of the crew re-boarded the stern later that night and the rest of the crew followed. After waiting for the weather to moderate, they got underway again on 13 February and encountered four British destroyers late on the 14th.  was tasked to screen the tanker as she headed for port. The weather deteriorated on the morning of the 15th and the tanker could not make any headway. An attempt to rig a tow by the destroyer failed and she took off the crew during the night. A tugboat and the destroyer  arrived, but the weather was too bad to re-board the stern section and Forester took the crew to Scapa Flow. Two more tugs were needed before the stern section could be towed to the Firth of Clyde and beached on the Isle of Bute on 26 February.

The stern section was later moved to Barclay Curle's dockyard at Elderslie where the damaged portions of the hull were trimmed away. A new forward half was built at Port Glasgow by William Hamilton and Company and mated to the stern section in 1941. The tanker returned to service in June.

The two torpedoes disabled the engines and steering gear and caused massive flooding. They returned the following day and managed to pump out some of her flooded compartments and get underway. The ship arrived at St. John's on 30 March where she received temporary repairs. Imperial Transport left St. John's on 24 August for New York and arrived on 5 September. She was repaired at Hoboken, New Jersey by Todd Shipbuilding & Drydock Co. and returned to service in February 1943 with a new spar deck installed for additional deck cargo.

The ship was sold to Victor Jenssens Rederi A/S of Oslo, Norway in 1947 and renamed Mesna. She was then sold to Skibs-A/S Agnes of Mandal two years later and renamed Rona. The ship was broken up in Hamburg, West Germany, in December 1958.

References

1931 ships
Ships built on the River Clyde
Maritime incidents in February 1940
Maritime incidents in March 1942
Tankers of the United Kingdom
Tankers of Norway
World War II merchant ships of the United Kingdom